Pullichroma is a monotypic moth genus in the family Geometridae erected by Jeremy Daniel Holloway in 1996. Its only species, Pullichroma pullicosta, was first described by Louis Beethoven Prout in 1931. It is found in Brunei, Indonesia (Sulawesi, Sumatra) and the Philippines.

References

External links

Pseudoterpnini
Geometridae genera
Monotypic moth genera
Moths described in 1931
Moths of Asia